Baron Alexander Alexandrovich von Taube (21 August 1864 – January 1919) was an Imperial Russian general. 

He fought in the war of Russia against the Empire of Japan. In WWI - Major General, later as Lieutenant General commanding 5th Siberian Infantry division. After 1916 democratic revolution in Russia he was elected by soldiers council to lead the Omsk (Siberia) military district. 

After 1917 Bolshevik insurrection he was conscripted, as military specialist, to serve in the Red army. His service with the Red army, during 1918, was planning strategic operations in Siberia. During that time, the Red Army in Siberia was defeated by the Volunteer Army of admiral Alexander Kolchak. General Taube was detained on the territory controlled by the Volunteer army.  Being taken to Yekaterinburg, at that time one of the centers of the White movement) he was investigated, offered service with the Volunteer Army, however while still in detention he died of typhus. 

Many years later Soviet historians described him as a first Red General, however it is well known that Soldiers Council Soviets in Siberia were under control of Social Revolutionary Party who were largely independent of Moscow Bolsheviks. It is confirmed that he was in the Red Army in 1918 as a "military specialist" (a person conscripted to serve the Red Army by order of the government). 
At the same time, his oldest son Alexandre, was an officer in Volunteer Army under admiral Alexander Kolchak fighting against the Red troops while his younger children were under Bolsheviks rule in Moscow. 

General Taube was born in Pavlovsk, Saint Petersburg. He had several brothers, including Mikhail Taube. He was a recipient of the Imperial Ruisshan decorations: Order of Saint Vladimir, the Order of Saint Anna, the Order of Saint Stanislaus (House of Romanov) and the Gold Sword for Bravery.

Bibliography
 Их именами названы улицы Омска. Омск. 1988.
 Сибирский красный генерал. В. С. Познанский. Новосибирск, 1972 (2-е изд. — 1978). A Soviet, following communist party line book, being published in the USSR.  
 Таубе Александр Александрович. Вибе П. П., Михеев А. П., Пугачёва Н. М. Омский историко-краеведческий словарь. Москва. 1994.

Sources
 Энциклопедия Омска: Омск в лицах
 Биография на сайте Хронос
 

1864 births
1919 deaths
Deaths from typhus
Russian military personnel of the Russo-Japanese War
Russian military personnel of World War I
Soviet military personnel of the Russian Civil War
Recipients of the Order of St. Vladimir, 2nd class
Recipients of the Order of St. Vladimir, 3rd class
Recipients of the Order of St. Vladimir, 4th class
Recipients of the Order of St. Anna, 1st class
Recipients of the Order of St. Anna, 3rd class
Recipients of the Order of Saint Stanislaus (Russian), 1st class
Recipients of the Order of Saint Stanislaus (Russian), 3rd class
Recipients of the Gold Sword for Bravery